Marston Halt railway station was a station in Marston, Herefordshire, England. The station was opened in 1856 and closed in 1955.  The station was located north east of the village, at the top of Marston Lane.

References

Further reading

Disused railway stations in Herefordshire
Railway stations in Great Britain opened in 1856
Railway stations in Great Britain closed in 1955
Former Great Western Railway stations